Jayson Blair (born May 17, 1983) is an American actor. He has appeared in many films and television series, including being a cast member of the sitcoms The Hard Times of RJ Berger (2010–2011) and The New Normal (2012–2013).

Early life
Blair was born in Detroit, Michigan.  He attended L'Anse Creuse High School-North in Macomb Township, Michigan, where he played tennis. After graduating in 2001, he made appearance in commercials for Taco Bell, Pizza Hut and the Honda Civic.

Filmography

Film

Television

Web

References

External links
 
 Jayson Blair – TV.com

1983 births
21st-century American male actors
Male actors from Detroit
American male film actors
American male television actors
Living people
People from Macomb County, Michigan